Gadhawa Rural Municipality  (Nepali: गढवा गाउँपालिका sometimes गडवा गाउँपालिका) is located in Deukhuri valley of Dang district of Lumbini Province, Nepal. This rural municipality was declared on Falgun 12, 2073 Vikram Samvat. It lies from 195 meter to 885 meter above sea level.
The former Gadhawa VDC office was the administrative center of Gadhawa Rural Municipality for 4 years of its inception and then the office of the executive was moved to a new building. According to the preliminary report of population census 2078, Gadhawa Rural Municipality has 46275 population where male and female comprises 22650 (48.95%) and 23625 (51.05%) population respectively. During local level restructuring, this rural municipality was formed by annexing former four VDCs named Gobardiya, Gangapraspur, Gadhawa and Koilabas. This rural municipality has a 358.57 square km area and is divided into 8 wards. It is surrounded by Arghakhanchi and Kapilvastu districts from the east, Rajapur Rural Municipality from the west, Lamahi Municipality and Rapti Rural Municipality in the north, and India in the south direction.

References

External links 
 Official website

 Populated places in Dang District, Nepal
Rural municipalities of Nepal established in 2017